The Dashing Archduke (German:Der fesche Erzherzog) is a 1927 Austrian-German silent film directed by Robert Land. The film's art direction was by Carl Ludwig Kirmse.

Cast
   Liane Haid 
 Ellen Kürti 
 Oskar Marion 
 Albert Paulig 
 Hans Mierendorff 
 Fritz Spira 
 Ernst Winar

References

Bibliography
 Hans-Michael Bock and Tim Bergfelder. The Concise Cinegraph: An Encyclopedia of German Cinema. Berghahn Books.

External links

1927 films
Austrian silent feature films
Films of the Weimar Republic
German silent feature films
Films directed by Robert Land
German black-and-white films